Judicial Correction Services, Incorporated (Delaware) (JCS)  is a privately held probation company established in 2001 and based in Georgia. Its CEO is Robert McMichael of Atlanta, GA. The company acts as a self-funding probation agency for local courts, mostly in the southeast United States. The company is part of the   private "extra-carceral" or "alternatives to incarceration" industry, which includes private halfway houses, probation services and/or electronic monitoring. This industry, which includes services such as Judicial Correctional Service is "offender-funded", shifting the cost of probation onto probationers. The industry includes private extra-carceral institutions such as halfway houses, probation services and electronic monitoring. In 2008, 2009 and 2010 J.C.S. was listed by Inc.'s as "the fastest growing company in the United States. In 2011 J.C.S was acquired by Correctional Healthcare Companies. In a July 2012 case regarding the contract between Judicial Correction Services and Harpersville, Alabama, Judge Hub Harrington accused JCS of egregious abuses which were akin to "debtors' prison" and an "extortion racket" condoned by the elected officials of Harpersville in their aggressive pursuit of fines owed the Harpersville Municipal Court.

If a person is sentenced to parole for committing a misdemeanor such as the inability to pay traffic fines, J.C.S ensures the probationer meets all the conditions of parole and requires the probationer to pay various  fees (in addition to fines) that provide a significant profit to the firm. Persons who are unwilling or unable to pay the fine and fees or who otherwise fail to meet the conditions of parole can be jailed.

J.C.S. operates in an environment where municipal courts across the United States are under considerable financial strain. By instigating the "offender-funded" initiative, that was once financed by government services, offender-funded companies save the public purse while turning a profit.

Aggressive pursuit of these fines and fees can double collections in some areas. On its website, the company claims all the courts it services have increased collections.

By 2009 JCS employed about 300 people and reported revenues of more than thirteen million dollars.

Controversies 

A Birmingham, Alabama lawyer William M. Dawson filed a lawsuit against Judicial Correction Services and Harpersville Municipal Court.

In July 2012, Judge Hub Harrington of Shelby County, Alabama halted the company’s aggressive pursuit of fines owed the Harpersville Municipal Court. He stated, 

Judge Harrington found that Harpersville Municipal Court's actions "repeatedly violated the constitutional rights of defendants" who were trapped by JCS into paying several times the amount of their original no-leniency court-imposed fines and fees. In his findings Judge Harrington described how under the contract between Judicial Correction Services and Harpersville a defendant who is unable to immediately pay in full a fine of $200 on the day of trial is placed on probation. JCS probation office charges the defendant a monthly fee which is so high that it would take 14 months to pay it off at a total cost of $200. Sometimes the JCS monthly fees would be even higher, requiring an "additional 40 months of payments totaling $2,100."

However, Bernard Harwood, a former associate justice of the Alabama Supreme Court, who was hired by JCS to review its practices, "found that the company was merely doing the job it had been hired to do, and that any jailing for debt was not the fault of JCS, because private probation companies do not have the legal authority to send people to jail or to determine indigence.".

In a 23 June 2014 in-depth article in The New Yorker journalist Sarah Stillman investigated whether lucrative profits from injustice were being made by the private "alternatives to incarceration" industry. Her article focused on J.C.S.

On March 11, 2015, the Southern Poverty Law Center filed suit accusing  the firm of violating federal racketeering laws by extorting money from impoverished Alabamians by threatening them with jail when they fall behind on paying fines from traffic violations or other citation. As part of the settlement agreement, the city of Clanton dropped its contract with Judicial Correction Services.  As a result, cities across Alabama have begun to drop contracts with Judicial Correction Services.

On March 22, 2015, television comedian and commentator John Oliver did a segment on municipal violations on his weekly HBO show, "Last Week Tonight." Part of the segment included details on the questionable operating methods of the firm and how their actions, in several cases, have only served to increase the debt of those who need to pay fines due to municipal violations.

Citations

References 
 
 
  
  Commissioned by Judicial Correction Services
 
 
 
 
 
 *

External links
 Company website

Private probation companies
Business services companies established in 2001
2001 establishments in Georgia (U.S. state)
American companies established in 2001
Business services companies of the United States